The Government of Poland takes the form of a unitary parliamentary representative democratic republic, whereby the President is the head of state and the Prime Minister is the head of government. However, its form of government has also been identified as semi-presidential.

Executive power is exercised, within the framework of a multi-party system, by the President and the Government, which consists of the Council of Ministers led by the Prime Minister. Its members are typically chosen from the majority party or coalition, in the lower house of parliament (the Sejm), although exceptions to this rule are not uncommon. The government is formally announced by the President, and must pass a motion of confidence in the Sejm within two weeks.

Legislative power is vested in the two chambers of parliament, Sejm and Senate. Members of Sejm are elected by proportional representation, with the proviso that non-ethnic-minority parties must gain at least 5% of the national vote to enter the lower house. Currently five parties are represented. Parliamentary elections occur at least every four years.

The president, as the head of state, is the supreme commander of the Armed Forces, has the power to veto legislation passed by parliament, which may be overridden by a majority of three fifths, and can dissolve the parliament under certain conditions.  Presidential elections occur every five years.  When a majority of voters support the same candidate, that candidate is declared the winner, while when there is no majority, the top two candidates participate in a runoff election.

The political system is defined in the Polish Constitution, which also guarantees a wide range of individual freedoms. The judicial branch plays a minor role in politics, apart from the Constitutional Tribunal, which can annul laws that violate the freedoms guaranteed in the constitution.

Executive branch 
The Prime Minister proposes, the President appoints, and the Sejm approves the Council of Ministers. The President is elected by popular vote for a five-year term, while the Prime Minister and Deputy Prime Ministers (if any) are appointed by the President and confirmed by the Sejm. The Council of Ministers is responsible to the Prime Minister and the Sejm.

Head of state
The President is elected by terms; as head of state, supreme commander of the Armed Forces, and supreme representative of the Republic of Poland. The President has the right to veto legislation, although veto may be overridden by the assembly with a three-fifths majority vote. The President, as representative of the state in foreign affairs, shall ratify and renounce international agreements, appoint and recall the plenipotentiary representatives of the Republic of Poland and shall cooperate with the Prime Minister and the appropriate minister in respect of foreign policy. As Supreme Commander of the Armed Forces, the President shall appoint the Chief of the General Staff and commanders of branches of the Armed Forces.

The President may, regarding particular matters, convene the Cabinet Council, although it does not possess the competence of the Council of Ministers. Official acts of the President shall require, for their validity, the signature of the Prime Minister, nevertheless this does not apply to:

nominating and appointing the Prime Minister
shortening of the term of office of the Sejm in the instances specified in the Constitution
introducing legislation
requesting the Sejm to appoint the President of the National Bank of Poland
appointing judges
proclaiming the holding of a nationwide referendum (a consent of the Senate is required)
signing or refusing to sign a bill
appointing the First President of the Supreme Court, President of the Constitutional Tribunal, members of the Council for Monetary Policy, appointing and dismissing members of the National Security Council
exercising the power of pardon
convening the Cabinet Council

Legislative branch 

The Polish Parliament has two chambers. The lower chamber (Sejm) has 460 members, elected for a four-year term by proportional representation in multi-seat constituencies using the d'Hondt method similar to that used in many parliamentary political systems, with a 5% threshold (8% for coalitions, threshold waived for national minorities). The Senate (Senat) has 100 members elected for a four-year term under the single member, one-round first-past-the-post voting method.  When sitting in joint session, members of the Sejm and Senate form the National Assembly, (Polish Zgromadzenie Narodowe). 

The National Assembly is formed on three occasions: Taking the oath of office by a new president, bringing an indictment against the President of the Republic to the Tribunal of State, and declaration of a President's permanent incapacity to exercise their duties due to the state of their health. Only the first kind has occurred to date. Since 1991 elections are supervised by the National Electoral Commission (Państwowa Komisja Wyborcza), whose administrative division is called the National Electoral Office (Krajowe Biuro Wyborcze).

Judicial branch

Justice 

Together with the tribunals, courts form part of the judiciary in Poland. Among the bodies that administer the justice system, the following are distinguished:

 Supreme Court;
 
 common courts;
 
 administrative courts;
 
 military courts.

Moreover, in times of war, the Constitution allows for the establishment of extraordinary courts or the establishment of an ad hoc procedure. Court proceedings have at least two instances. The main laws regulating the operation of the judiciary are:

 The Act of 27 July 2001 - Law on the System of Common Courts;
 
 The Act of July 25, 2002 - Law on the System of Administrative Courts;
 
 The Act of August 21, 1997 - Law on the System of Military Courts;
 
 The Act of 23 November 2002 on the Supreme Court;
 
 The Act of 27 July 2001 on the National Council of the Judiciary.

Judges 

Judges are appointed by the President, at the request of the National Council of the Judiciary, for an indefinite period. They cannot belong to political parties or trade unions, are independent, and are subject only to the Constitution and statutes. They are entitled to immunity and personal inviolability. Judges are also irremovable  and their removal from office or suspension requires a court decision. The participation of other citizens in the administration of justice is defined by law  and boils down to the application of the system of a lay judge in the first instance in common and military courts.

Supreme Court 

The Supreme Court (Supreme Court) is a supervisory body over common and military courts. It is headed by the First President of the Supreme Court, appointed for a six-year term by the President of the Republic of Poland, from among candidates presented by the General Assembly of the Supreme Court of Justice. Until 2018, the Court was divided into four chambers: Civil, Criminal, Military and Labour, Social Security and Public Affairs. Since 2018, there are chambers: Civil, Criminal, Labour and Social Security, Extraordinary Control and Public Affairs, and Disciplinary. Apart from the General Assembly, the second body of judicial self-government is the College of the Supreme Court.

Common judiciary 

The common judiciary has three tiers. Its structure consists of district, regional and appellate courts. Common courts rule on criminal, civil, labor, economic and family law. Until 2001, there were also misdemeanor colleges, but the Constitution abolished their functioning.

Military judiciary 

Military courts are criminal courts, ruling primarily on crimes committed by soldiers on active military service. The structure of the military judiciary is made up of garrison courts and military district courts. The Criminal Chamber (until 2018, including the Military Chamber) of the Supreme Court acts as the second instance or court of cassation.

Administrative judiciary 

Administrative judiciary already existed in the Second Polish Republic, but it was abolished after World War II. Its gradual restoration began in 1980 with the creation of the Supreme Administrative Court (NSA). The current Constitution introduced the principle of two-instance procedures, which resulted in the establishment of voivodeship administrative courts adjudicating in the first instance. Administrative courts control the legality of administrative decisions, both against the governmental and self-governmental authorities. The President of the Supreme Administrative Court is appointed by the President for a six-year term, from among the candidates nominated by the General Assembly of Judges of the Supreme Administrative Court.

National Council of the Judiciary 

The National Council of the Judiciary is a body established to protect the independence of courts and judges. He submits applications to the President to appoint judges. It has the right to apply to the Constitutional Tribunal in matters relating to the compliance of normative acts with the Constitution in the area relating to the judiciary. The National Council of the Judiciary consists of: the First President of the Supreme Court, the Minister of Justice, the President of the Supreme Administrative Court, a person appointed by the President, 15 judges of the Supreme Court, common, administrative and military courts, four deputies and two senators. The term of office of elected members is four years. The chairman and two of his deputies are elected from among the members of the Council.

Tribunals

Elections

2019 Parliamentary Elections

2020 Presidential Election

National security 
Poland's top national security goal is to further integrate with NATO and other west European defense, economic, and political institutions via a modernization and reorganization of its military. Polish military doctrine reflects the same defense nature as its NATO partners.

The combined Polish army consists of 100,300 active duty personnel and in addition 234,000 reserves.
In 2009 the Armed Forces transformed into a fully professional organization and compulsory military service was abolished. Personnel levels and organization in the different branches are as follows (2004):

 Land Forces: 60,000  (4 divisions, independent units and territorial forces)
 Air Force: 26,000 (Air and Air Defense Corps)
 Navy: 14,300 (2 Fleets)
 Special Forces: 1,700 (4 Special Units – GROM, 1 PSK, "Formoza", special logistics Military Unit)

The Polish military continues to restructure and to modernize its equipment. The Polish Defense Ministry General Staff and the Land Forces staff have recently reorganized the latter into a NATO-compatible J/G-1 through J/G-6 structure. Budget constraints hamper such priority defense acquisitions as a multi-role fighter, improved communications systems, and an attack helicopter.

Poland continues to be a regional leader in support and participation in the NATO Partnership for Peace Program and has actively engaged most of its neighbors and other regional actors to build stable foundations for future European security arrangements. Poland continues its long record of strong support for United Nations peacekeeping operations; it maintaining a unit in Southern Lebanon (part of the United Nations Interim Force in Lebanon, a battalion in NATO's Kosovo Force (KFOR), and providing and actually deploying the KFOR strategic reserve to Kosovo. Poland is a strong ally of the US in Europe, and it led the Multinational Division Central-South in Iraq in the 2000s.

Government Protection Bureau 
The State Protection Service (Polish: Służba Ochrony Państwa, SOP) is Poland's equivalent of the Secret Service in the United States, providing antiterrorism and VIP security detail services for the government.

Administrative divisions

Poland is divided in 16 provinces or Voivodeships (województwa, singular – województwo): Lower Silesia, Kuyavia-Pomerania, Łódzkie, Lubelskie, Lubuskie, Lesser Poland, Masovian, Opolskie, Subcarpathia, Podlaskie, Pomerania, Silesia, Świętokrzyskie, Warmia-Masuria, Greater Poland and West Pomerania.

Foreign relations 

Poland wields considerable influence in Central and Eastern Europe and is a middle power in international affairs. The foreign policy of Poland is based on four basic commitments: to Atlantic co-operation, to European integration, to international development and to international law. Since the collapse of communism and its re-establishment as a democratic nation, Poland has extended its responsibilities and position in European and Western affairs, supporting and establishing friendly foreign relations with both the West and with numerous European countries.

Due to its tragic historical experience with aggression of powerful neighbors (e.g., Partitions of Poland, Second World War), Polish foreign policy pursues close cooperation with a strong partner, one apt enough to give strong military support in times of critical situations. This creates the background of Poland's tight relations with the USA. At the same time, the equally burdened attitude towards Russia results in very tense diplomatic relations, which have been constantly worsening since Vladimir Putin's rise to power. This is an important factor for the special attention Poland pays to the political emancipation of all its Eastern neighbors: Lithuania, Belarus and Ukraine.

See also
 Poland
 Politics of Europe
 Visegrád Group
 Liberalism in Poland
 Polish government-in-exile
 Political parties in Poland
 Poland A and B

References

External links
 Erik Herron's Guide to Politics of East Central Europe and Eurasia
 PGB surveys